Uddingston Shinty Club is a  shinty club which plays in Uddingston, South Lanarkshire, Scotland. It plays in South Division Two.

History

Uddingston Shinty Club grew from the establishment of a school club in Uddingston Grammar School in 2016 by a teacher from South Uist, Lee Thompson, formerly of Uist Camanachd who played for Tayforth Camanachd.

The club was officially founded in 2019

It developed a women's section and a men's section which entered senior competition in 2022 . this was after a delay caused by COVID cancelling the 2020 season and the 2021 season being shortened.

In 2022, Uddingston's men had a difficult first season, being unable to fulfil fixtures on three occasions and finishing bottom. They groundshared with Glasgow Mid-Argyll at Peterson Park in Yoker.

The club has a sponsorship deal with Tunnocks.

References

External links
 Uddingston at Shinty.com
 YouTube Video from 2019 with history of club

Shinty teams
Sport in South Lanarkshire
Sports clubs established in 2019
2019 establishments in Scotland